Ndindi  is a small town in Gabon. It is the capital of the Haute-Banio in Nyanga Province.

See also
Antoine Mboumbou Miyakou

References

Populated places in Nyanga Province